Great Bentley railway station is on the Sunshine Coast Line, a branch of the Great Eastern Main Line, in the East of England, serving the village of Great Bentley as well as the nearby settlements of Brightlingsea, Frating, Thorrington and St Osyth. Its three-letter station code is GRB.

The station was opened by the Tendring Hundred Railway, a subsidiary of the Great Eastern Railway, in 1866 with the name Bentley Green. It was renamed Great Bentley in 1877. It is currently managed by Greater Anglia, which also operates all trains serving the station.

History

By the time the Wivenhoe extension opened, the line was operated by the Great Eastern Railway (GER) which bought the line from the Tendring Hunded Railway in 1883.

Bentley Green station opened on the same day. It adopted its current name of Great Bentley in 1877.

The Wivenhoe to Great Bentley section was doubled in 1898.

Operation of the station passed to the London and North Eastern Railway in 1923. In 1948 the station became part of the Eastern Region of British Railways. The 1955 modernisation plan proposed the electrification of the line through Great Bentley and electric services commenced on 13 April 1959.

There was once a small goods yard to the east of the station which had cattle pens, coal wharves and an end loading ramp. In later years the main traffic was coal, agricultural fertilisers and sugar beet. The yard was closed in the 1950s.

Network Rail replaced the manually-controlled level crossing gates at Great Bentley with barriers in 2008 as part of a £104 million resignalling project between Colchester and Clacton-on-Sea. The former signal box was located at the eastern end of the "up" (London-bound) platform and had 25 levers for the signals and points.

Great Bentley has two platforms. Platform 1 is used for westbound services towards  and London Liverpool Street. When built, the two platforms were linked with a lattice footbridge. This was removed in the 1950s when the line was being prepared for electrification.

Services

Current timetable
The typical service pattern is:

Historical timetables

The following services called in July 1922 (the last year of operation by the Great Eastern Railway):
8 up services (Monday-Saturday)
9 down services (Monday-Saturday)
4 up services (Sundays)
3 down services (Sundays)

In June 1956 the timetable showed:
17 up services to Colchester (Monday-Saturday)
15 down services to Clacton (Monday-Saturday)

During the summer of 1972 the timetable showed:
17 up services to Colchester (Monday-Friday)
18 down services to Clacton  (Monday-Friday)
Some services worked through to Liverpool Street. On summer Saturdays, 24 down and 21 up trains called.

References

External links 

 Great Bentley village website with a picture of two steam locomotives at this station
 Great Bentley station interactive plan
 Live departures from Great Bentley

Railway stations in Essex
DfT Category E stations
Former Great Eastern Railway stations
Railway stations in Great Britain opened in 1866
Greater Anglia franchise railway stations
1866 establishments in England
Great Bentley